InsideView is a software as a service (SaaS) company that gleans insights and relationships from more than 40,000 sources of business information, contact data, online news, and social media. Founded in 2005, InsideView is mainly used by marketing, sales, and operations teams in identifying and gathering information on customers and prospects. In April 2021, the company was acquired by Demandbase, Inc.

History 
InsideView was founded in 2005 by Umberto Milletti, a former executive and co-founder at DigitalThink, an early Web-based corporate training company. In November 2007, the company acquired competitor TrueAdvantage. After the acquisition, InsideView moved all 2,500 TrueAdvantage customers over to its platform.

InsideView's core product is a business-to-business (B2B) data and intelligence platform. It helps marketing, sales, and operations people more effectively target the accounts that matter most to their business, and work with those companies in a highly relevant way.  InsideView products are available as stand-alone web applications as well as integrated with CRM systems like Microsoft Dynamics 365, NetSuite, Oracle CRM, Salesforce.com, SAP CEC CRM (C4C), SugarCRM and Marketing Automation systems including Marketo.

On October 21, 2013, InsideView announced that it had entered into a strategic OEM agreement with Microsoft whereby InsideView was integrated into Microsoft Dynamics CRM Online. Through the agreement, InsideView was available to all users of Microsoft Dynamics CRM Online, and was known as Insights, powered by InsideView. That agreement ended in 2020 and Microsoft Dynamics customers now buy InsideView Insights directly from InsideView.

The company has been named to the CRM Watchlist in 2017.

In May, 2021, InsideView became part of Demandbase, Inc.

Competition 
InsideView's competitors include services such as Dun & Bradstreet/Avention and ZoomInfo.

References

Further reading 
 InsideView Disrupts Legacy Business Info Publishers Like Hoover's. November 19, 2009
 InsideView Secures $7.4 Million in Series A Funding. American Venture Magazine. June 5, 2007. Archived October 14, 2007.
 
 InsideView acquires TrueAdv. VentureBeat. November 26, 2007.
 InsideView Strengthens Integration With SAP Hybris’s Sales Cloud. March 16, 2017
 The 6 Sales Tools You Need to Crush Sales in 2017. December 31, 2016
 Is your data ready for ABM?. December 7, 2016

Companies based in San Francisco